North Kayong Regency is a regency of West Kalimantan province in Indonesia. It covers an area of 4,568.26 km2, and had a population of 95,594 at the 2010 Census and 126,571 at the 2020 Census; the official estimate as at mid 2021 was 128,550. The principal town lies in Sukadana. The nearest airport is Ketapang Airport.

History 
North Kayong Regency was created in 2007, following a central government decision to split the area off from the Ketapang Regency.

Administrative Districts 
At the time of the 2010 Census, the North Kayong Regency consisted of five districts (kecamatan); subsequently, the offshore islands district of Pulau Maya Karimata has been split in two - Pulau Maya (a large island situated closer to the Kalimantan "mainland", with surrounding islets) and Kepulauan Karimata (an archipelago of 83 islands lying further to the west). The districts are tabulated below with their populations at the 2010 Census and the 2020 Census, together with the official estimates as at mid 2021. The table includes the locations of the district administrative centres, the number of administrative villages (all rural desa) in each district, and its post code.

Note: (a) comprising the five desa of Dusun Besar, Dusun Kecil, Kemboja, Satai Lestari and Tanjung Satai.(b) comprising the three desa of Padang, Pelapis and Betok Jaya.(c) including offshore Pelintu Island. (d) including nine offshore islands - Bagu, Cermin, Datok, Juante, Katung, Lalang, Nanas, Payung and Salahnama.

Economy 
The main industries consists in the production of palm oil, rubber and wood.

Education
The current political leadership has made commitments to provide free education and health care to all residents and primary and secondary school fees that are paid elsewhere in Indonesia have been waived.  There are no institutes of higher education.  The Regency is currently developing a polytechnic.

Health
The local government provides free public health care through clinics throughout the province, including a ‘floating clinic’ based on a boat to serve the islands off the west coast of the regency.  A privately run clinic is operated by the NGO ASRI in Sukadana town. The nearest hospitals are in the neighboring regency of Ketapang.

Demographics

North Kayong has a minority population of Chinese with the majority being indigenous Malays. Most Chinese residents in North Kayong are of either Teochew or Hakka. The native Indonesians living there are mainly of Malay descent.  In regards to speech, most citizens of North Kayong incorporate a type of Malay accent in their Indonesian, which is somewhat similar to that used in Malaysia.

Transportation
The nearest airport is Rahadi Osman at Ketapang. The airport has some connecting flights to Pontianak, Semarang via Pangkalan Bun, and Jakarta.  Boats from Sukadana, Teluk Melano and Teluk Batang run daily to Pontianak.

Places
 Gunung Palung National Park, a beautiful rainforest park that can be reached from Sukadana.
 Datok Island beach

Hotels
The largest hotel is the Makhota Kayong in Sukadana.

References

Populated places in West Kalimantan
Regencies of West Kalimantan